Gokulamlo Seeta is a 1997 Indian Telugu-language drama film  directed by Muthyala Subbaiah and produced by B. Srinivasa Raju under the Sri Sai Chitra banner. It stars Pawan Kalyan and Raasi.It also stars Harish Kumar in an important role. The music is composed by Koti. The film is remake of the Tamil film Gokulathil Seethai.

Plot
Pawan Kalyan is a careless and spoiled brat of a rich man Muddu Krishnayya. Kalyan has every weakness that a rich and careless youth can have, and Baburao helps him in all his activities. Once, Kalyan and his friend/employee Bhaskar attend a function, where Kalyan spots Sirisha singing on stage, and is impressed by her beauty and tries to woo her, but doesn't succeed. At the same time, Bhaskar too is impressed by her and expresses his love to her, but is rejected by Sirisha. A disheartened Bhaskar tries to commit suicide but is saved. Sirisha accepts his love and leaves to see her mother to seek her blessings for marriage. But her mother plans something else for her. She tries to marry her off with her cousin Sriram. Sirisha writes a letter to Bhaksar to take her away and save her from this marriage. Kalyan is shocked, when he knows that Bhaskar is trying to marry the same Sirisha, who rejected his offer, but agrees to bring her. Kalyan manages to bring Sirisha to Bhaskar's house, but Bhaskar's parents oppose this marriage by insulting Sirisha. Kalyan loses his temper and hits Bhaskar's father, adding fuel to fire. A disheartened Sirisha leaves their house, but is saved by Kalyan and taken to his house. His father Muddu Krishnayya and servant, Malli suspect their relationship, and this suspicion spreads in Kalyan's friends circle. Sirisha accuses Kalyan of all these rumors and this brings about a change in Kalyan's attitude towards women and his life. He decides to marry Sirisha and asks his father to help him in this regard. But his father insults her and she leaves their house and returns to her mother. Kalyan, after learning his father's mistake, reaches Sirisha's house, but is discouraged by her cousin and mother. He goes on a hunger strike till she accepts his love. In the end, Muddu Krishnayya apologises for his mistake and unites the lovers.

Cast

 Pawan Kalyan as Pawan Kalyan 
 Raasi as Sirisha
 Harish Kumar as Bhaskar
 Kota Srinivasa Rao as Muddu Krishnayya
 Srihari as Hari
 Achyuth as Sriram
 Brahmanandam as SI Brahmam
 Sudhakar as Broker Babu Rao
 Mallikarjuna Rao as Malli, Pawan Kalyan's servant
 Ali as Babu Rao's brother-in-law
 Rallapalli as Bhaskar's father
 Priya as Sirisha's younger sister
 Venu Madhav 
 Kallu Chidambaram  
 Sangeetha 
 Raksha
 Rajini 
 Radha Prashanthi 
 Priyanka 
 Ooma Sarma

Soundtrack

Music composed by Koti. Music released on Lahari Music Company.

Reception 
A critic from Andhra Today noted that "The director Mutyala Subbaiah proves his directorial prowess in handling a sensitive story but for (some dragging and unwarranted scenes) the climax".

References

External links
 

1997 films
1990s Telugu-language films
Telugu remakes of Tamil films
Indian drama films
Films scored by Koti
Films directed by Muthyala Subbaiah